Alessia Pezone (born 23 April 1993) is an Italian synchronised swimmer.

Biography
Pezone is an athlete of the Gruppo Sportivo Fiamme Oro. She won a bronze medal in the team free routine competition at the 2018 European Aquatics Championships.

References

External links
 

1993 births
Living people
Italian synchronized swimmers
World Aquatics Championships medalists in synchronised swimming
Artistic swimmers at the 2019 World Aquatics Championships
European Aquatics Championships medalists in synchronised swimming
People from Frascati
Artistic swimmers of Fiamme Oro
Sportspeople from the Metropolitan City of Rome Capital